Club Social y Deportivo Urunday Universitario is an Uruguayan sports club located in the Prado barrio of Montevideo. Its name comes from Astronium balansae. Its main sports include basketball, and their team currently plays in the Liga Uruguaya de Básquetbol (LUB), the first division.

History 
It is the result of the union Club Atlético Urunday (Urunday Athletic Club) and Club Universitario del Uruguay (University Club of Uruguay) in 1978. In 1934, joins theLiga Universitaria de Deportes (League of University Sports), where to this day campaigning in the divisional A. In 1946 joins the Uruguayan Basketball Federation (FUBB).

Current roster

References

External links
 Official website

Sport in Montevideo
Prado, Montevideo